Hits 53 is a compilation album released in the UK in July 2002. It contains 41 tracks on two CDs, including four number one singles from the UK Singles Chart from Gareth Gates, Will Young, Holly Valance, and Liberty X.

The music video for Gareth Gates song "Anyone of Us (Stupid Mistake)" is featured on disc two as a special enhanced feature, available to watch when put into a PC.

"Underneath Your Clothes" by Shakira is sometimes given in online track listings but does not feature in the end - instead "Whenever, Wherever" features (Hits 52 previously featured this song in Spanish language).

Track listing
Disc one

Disc two

References

External links
 Hits 53 @ Discogs

2002 compilation albums
Hits (compilation series) albums